Bhakti Thapa Chhetri (1741 A.D. Lamjung, Nepal – 1815 A.D.) was a Nepalese military commander and administrator in the Kingdom of Nepal. Initially, he served for the Kingdom of Lamjung. He is considered one of the national heroes of Nepal.

Grand Old Man Bhakti Thapa Chhetri was the Sardar (commander) of Lamjung state, so he fought against Gorkhali in the battle from the side of Kehari Narayan, the King of Lamjung. After the fall of Lamjung in the battle against the Gorkhali (Nepali) forces, he was captured and brought to Kathmandu as a prisoner of war. Later he was appointed as sirdar (one of the sirdars) in the Nepali army. Just two years after the unification of Jumla, he was made the supreme commander (Sardar) of the Nepalese army stationed to the west of the capital in a region that stretched almost up to the Sutlej river, and also the administrator of this region. Sardar Bhakti Thapa's great success in the unification of Jumla District made him a legendary figure. He was a patriot involved in the Anglo-Nepalese War. His most important contribution in the war was at the western front of Deothal.

In the Anglo-Nepal war, Sardar Bhakti Thapa was controlling operation of the whole Western Region of Nepal from the fort of Malaun, whereas the fort of Surajgadh was in the south of this fort. There was fierce fighting between the two forces, killing 100 soldiers of the British army while all the officers were killed except only on arsenal. In this battle when Sardar Bhakti Thapa Chhetri tried to capture a British cannon, he was hit by the bullet at his heart. The Major David Ochterlony, handed over very respectfully to the Nepalese army, the dead body of Sardar Bhakti Thapa Chhetri after covering it with dosalla (a woollen shawl). The very next day, his body was cremated with the due state guard of honour. His two wives committed Sati (burning themselves on their husband's pyre). Before going to the battlefield, he had handed over his grandson to Bada Kaji Amar Singh Thapa Chhetri. Sitting at the foot of the flag of Nepal, Bada Kaji Amar Singh Thapa Chhetri and Ram Das, the son of Sardar Bhakti Thapa Chhetri, encouraged the Nepalese army looking around at the sight of war. The Anglo-Nepal war took a different turn after the end of this battle. The way Sardar Bhakti Thapa Chhetri laid down his life at the Deothal battle has become a legend in Nepalese history.

He was Thapa Chhetri.He belonged to Punwar Thapa clan.

Childhood legend

According  to  recent  historians, Bhakti Thapa was born in  1741. Bhakti  Thapa's  family lived in Dhangai, a remote village in  Lamjung.  Very little is known about the  childhood life of Bhakti Thapa. There was,  however, an unbelievable incident in the  early life of Bhakti  Thapa.  That incident is virtually like a description from the  children's story book.  The full details of  that incident had been passed down through the generations. Still many old people in Lamjung are seen telling that incident  to their youngsters.  That  incident  is  described below.

Bhakti Thapa was  still  a  very  young  boy. The  old  neighbour  woman  stormed  out  of  her  house  into the place where  Bhakti  Thapa  was  fast  asleep  in  a  rage  cursing  him for  his  misdeeds. What  she  saw  at  that  time  chilled  her  blood. The  serpent  slowly  uncoiled  without  waking  up  the boy  and  descended  from  the  boulder. It  disappeared  from  the  sight  after slipping  into  the  bushes  nearby.

The  parents  of  the  Bhakti  Thapa  were  terribly  distressed  when  they  learnt  about  the  whole  incident. They  thanked  the God  for  saving  the  life  of  their  beloved  son. The  old  neighbour  woman  who  saw  the  whole  incident  had a  completely  different  opinion. She  was  convinced  that  Bhakti  Thapa  was  no  ordinary  man. He  possessed  some  sort  of  divine  power. She  was  quick  to  realize  that  one  day  Bhakti  Thapa  would  become  a  very  famous  person.

The  big  boulder  near  the native home  of  Bhakti  Thapa  in Lamjung  is  linked  up  twice  with  the  events  in  his  later  life.  After  some  years a  grand  ritual  was  performed  to  solemnize  brotherhood  relationship (in Nepali  metairi)  between  Bhakti  Thapa  and  that  big  boulder.  The  third  event  that linked  Bhakti  Thapa  with that  big  boulder  near  his  native  home  was  the  last  in  his life.    It  is  said  that  at  that  very  moment  during  the Anglo-Nepal  War  when  Bhakti  Thapa  fell  in  the  Deothal  Battle  field  on  April 16, 1815,  the  big  boulder near his native home also cracked  with loud explosion. The cracked boulder  is still lying there.
The government of Nepal (GoN) decleared him as a nation hero on 28 July 2021.

Unification campaign of Nepal

Bhakti Thapa joined the unification campaign in 1789 at a time when further advance of the Nepalese force to the west was completely blocked for more than two years by the then powerful kingdom of Jumla. It is said that Jumla had collected an army of twenty-two thousand men to face the Gorkhalis, a force far superior to anything the Gorkhalis could put in the field at that time In the first major military operation itself Bhakti Thapa had demonstrated his exceptionally brilliant skill in launching a very successful operation under the most adverse condition that was sure to astonish anyone. He changed the strategy of the predecessors and led an attack on Jumla from the difficult north route. The result was a swift victory and the lives of many people were also saved.

Within a very short period of just two years, from 1789 to 1791, the western boundary of the Great Nepal had extended nearly as far as the Sutlez River (now India). Bhakti Thapa had played a crucial role in such rapid expansion of the Great Nepal. At that very time, Nepal was attacked by China from the north. During that period China was ruled by the powerful Emperor Chiang Lung of the Manchu Dynasty.

Among the Manchu emperors, Kang Hu Shi and Chiang Lung are considered to be the most influential. Emperor Kang Hu Shi ruled China from 1661 to 1722. He was contemporary with the Louis XIV of France, Peter the Great of Russia and Aurangazeb of India. Similarly, Emperor Chiang Lung ruled from 1736 to 1796. During his reign, countries like Burna or Korea were under the influence of China.

Administration in Western front
The royal court sent the following orders to Bhakti Thapa regarding the abolition of slave trading in Garhwal:

Nepal in great danger
The Chinese invasion was directed straight towards Kathmandu. The main attack was centered on Kyrung, which is almost to the north of the Kathmandu valley. The Chinese attack was anticipated well in advance. As a result, Nepal had withdrawn most of its troops and commanders from the west to defend the capital Kathmandu against the Chinese invasion. It was the most critical period in the history of the newly born Great Nepal.

The existence of Nepal was in great danger. The country was under the threat of falling apart. In many areas the rulers of the old regimes, who were disgruntled at the creation of the Great Nepal, had begun to stir up unrest. According to Sainikitihas of Nepal, Bhakti Thapa stationed in Kumaun virtually single-handedly succeeded in quelling the unrest fomented by the rulers of the old regime in the vast western regions which were very recently merged into the Great Nepal, despite the fact that he was made supreme commander and administrator of the territory stretching from Chepe-Marshyangdi to almost Sutlez River only in 1794. The Sainikitihas describes that Bhakti Thapa was constantly on the move from one end of this vast region to the other end, to prevent the Great Nepal from falling apart.

Nepal and China realized that it would not be in the interest of either of the countries to prolong the war. A compromise solution was found to resolve the disputes that led to outbreak of the war. The fighting ended. According to L. Stiller there was no real winner. Immediately after the signing of peace treaty with China, Bhakti Thapa headquartered in Kumaun (now India) became the governor and chief commander of the whole region from the Chepe-Marshyangdi to almost the Sutlez River (in Pakistan).

Britain's suspicion
The process of expansion of the Great Nepal was rapid. It was natural for the East India Company to be greatly alarmed. So the East India Company administration might not have in reality any intention of helping Nepal. We can draw such a conclusion from the circumstances surrounding the visit of Captain Kirkpatrick to Kathmandu in 1793. The Governor-general of India had agreed to send Kirkpatrick to mediate in Nepal- China dispute. Kirkpatrick did not even set out for Nepal until after the war had been successfully terminated by the Nepal-China agreement. The governor general was requested not to send Kirkpatrick since the war had been amicably concluded. Surprisingly the governor general was adamant on sending a man to Kathmandu. So Kirkpatrick visited Kathmandu for no specific official purpose. The intention of Kirkpatrick's visit could hardly be anything else but to watch closely Nepal's speedy preparation for the next phase of the unification campaign that had officially led to the emergence of Bhakti Thapa as its head.

During the visit, Kirkpatrick found that Nepal was trying to reinvigorate the attack in the west. The circumstances, under which the visit of Kirkpatrick to Kathmandu took place, clearly show that the Company administration in India were all the time watching Nepal with great suspicion. At that time the East India Company administration were adopting every possible method to enlarge the territory under their control. The way new territories were brought under the control if the East India Company and ruled had provoked the interest of British public. The British Parliament had gone completely against it.

Anglo-Nepal War

The process of expansion of the Great Nepal had spread rapidly across the Himalayan region. So it was natural for the East India Company to be greatly alarmed. The Great Nepal was seen all along as a threat to Company rule in India till the end of the Anglo-Nepal War of 1814–16.

The East India Companyactively began preparation for the war from the time when F.R. Warren Hastings - Earl of Moira landed in India as Governor General and Commander-in-Chief in 1813. The actual declaration of war against Nepal is recorded as 1 November 1814, though the war began from the middle of October. The decision to declare war had been made six months earlier so the territorial dispute appears to be only a pretext. The eastern East India Company flank was moving north from the Teesta area, whereas the farthermost western flank came from the Sutlej river area. It was virtually a modern-type warfare extended over a period of three calendar years and necessitating to protect the entire region bordering the enemy-held territory. The British invasion forces, in comparison with the Nepalese, had absolute superiority in cavalry, pioneers, and at least the superiority of 10 times in infantry and 100 times in artillery. They also had the advantage of maneuverability in movement.

In the early months of the war, the initial British invasion force was completely frustrated by Nepalese tactics. The British offensive ended in complete failure. Nepalese forces stationed within the shelter of the fortress were not only able to defend their position against an invading enemy many times superior in strength, but they even shocked them by their dreadful counteroffensive that used to be accompanied by big losses on the British side.

After the initial defeats, the British changed their strategy to avoid their casualties. They started to deploy long-range guns to level Nepal's fortifications. This strategy paid off. The British were able to advance quickly into the territory under Nepal's control. They even used elephants to carry heavy guns across the mountains. So the ability of the Nepalese force to defend the territory under their control was steadily declining. They were forced to pull back. There was a breakdown in the command and control system.

Towards the middle of 1815, Amar Singh Thapa, chief of the Nepalese forces fighting in the western front, was confined within a small area of the Malaun fort. The fate of Nepal was going to be in the hands of the Governor General Lord Hastings, who was determined to solidify Company rule in India. At that time he worked either to eliminate Nepal completely and bring it under Company rule or to transform it into a vassal state like so many other states under that category in Colonial India. He could be forced not to take any such decision detrimental to the honour of Nepal only if he perceived that such action could pose serious threat to the continuance of Company rule in India. The Deothal Battle could not be anything else but a clear message of threat on behalf of Nepalese people to the East India Company warning them not to take lightly the determination of Nepalese people to protect the honour of their country.

Battle of Deuthal
Towards sunset on April 16, 1815, Bhakti Thapa and the army units under him arrived at the Malaun fort from their station at Surajgarh, without being noticed by the East India Company units scattered around the Malaun fortress.

The following day in the morning, Bhakti Thapa, at the age of 73, led a daring counterattack against the East India Company force entrenched at Deuthal. Historians have presented the description of this battle at great length. It was 3.15 a.m. when a force of just about 400 under Bhakti Thapa marched out of the Malaun fort, to a slow but steady beat of a drum. The British column under Thompson had taken position at Deothal on reverse slopes. The cannons of 6-pounders were properly concealed. There were two Indian battalions, the Grenadiers companies of the Light Battalions and some 1,000 irregulars. The British strength was up to about 3,500 troops and weapons.

Bhakti Thapa and his followers in the counterattack appeared to have vowed to fight to the death. Bhakti Thapa had even handed his infant grandson to the custody of the Amar Singh Thapa just before going to the battlefield. Bhakti Thapa laid down his life in the battlefield. Every one who fought from the Nepalese side was either killed or wounded.

Reputation
The British commanders were thoroughly impressed by the bravery of Bhakti Thapa in the Deothal Battle. Bhakti Thapa became a legend even in the eyes of British historians. One of the historians, CB Khanduri writes quoting various contemporary British historians:
 "The euphemism of the BRAVEST OF THE BRAVES had been used by Napoleon for Marshal Ney, whose bravery during the retreat from Moscow in 1812 was one of the highest. BRAVE LES BRAVE, said Napoleon of him. The British then used this citation for the Gurkhas during and after the Anglo-Nepal War. Such was the bravery shown by Bhakti Thapa that the next legend of the Bravest of the Braves had been created on the day - 16 April 1815 at Deothal."

Badass of The Week website has written a tribute page for Sardar Bhakti Thapa.

Citations

References
 

1741 births
1815 deaths
Gurkhas
Nepalese military personnel
People from Lamjung District
People of the Anglo-Nepalese War
People of the Nepalese unification
Nepalese military personnel killed in action
National heroes of Nepal